Stenocercus iridescens is a species of lizard of the Tropiduridae family. It is found in Peru, Colombia, and Ecuador.

References

Stenocercus
Reptiles described in 1859
Reptiles of Colombia
Reptiles of Peru
Reptiles of Ecuador
Taxa named by Albert Günther